Reggae Golden Jubilee (official album title: Reggae Golden Jubilee - Origins of Jamaican Popular Music) is a compilation album that commemorates Jamaica’s 50th anniversary of independence. It was released on 6 November 2012. Reggae Golden Jubilee includes four CDs featuring Jamaica’s top 100 hit songs and a 64-page booklet of notation with iconic photographs.
Reggae Golden Jubilee as the name says, is a quadruple-disc album celebrating Jamaican music from head-to-toe. The album featured Ska, Rocksteady, Reggae, Roots Reggae and Dancehall with classic legends to young artists, such as Millie Small, Bob Marley & The Wailers, Eric Donaldson, Dawn Penn, Buju Banton, Sizzla, Beenie Man, Sean Paul, Damian "Jr. Gong" Marley, Shaggy, Mavado etc.

The tracks were selected by Edward Seaga, a former Prime Minister of Jamaica, who also wrote the liner notes and the track notations of Reggae Golden Jubilee. Seaga is also well known as the founder of the music label West Indies Records Limited (WIRL), and was associated in the development of the Jamaican music industry at large.

Executive producers
Edward Seaga, Chris Chin

Track listing

Disc 1

Disc 2

Disc 3

Disc 4

References

2012 compilation albums
Reggae albums by Jamaican artists
Reggae compilation albums